Nanjing railway station is one of the two main railway stations of Nanjing, Jiangsu.

Nanjing railway station may also refer to:
 Nanjing railway station (Taiwan), in Chiayi County, Taiwan
 Nanjing railway station (Fujian), in Nanjing County, Fujian

See also
Nanjing South railway station, the second main station of Nanjing
Zhonghuamen railway station, formerly known as Nanjing South railway station
Nanjing West railway station, which has no passenger service now but was of importance before the construction of the Yangzte River Bridge
Nanjing North railway station (disambiguation)